Diamond was a 40-gun fourth-rate frigate of the English Royal Navy, originally built for the navy of the Commonwealth of England by Peter Pett at Deptford Dockyard, and launched on 15 March 1652. By 1677 her armament had been increased to 48 guns.

Diamond was captured by the French in 1693.

Notes

Citations

References

 Lavery, Brian (2003) The Ship of the Line - Volume 1: The development of the battlefleet 1650-1850. Conway Maritime Press. .
 British Warships in the Age of Sail (1603 – 1714), by Rif Winfield, published by Seaforth Publishing, England © Rif Winfield 2009, EPUB :
 Fleet Actions, 1.1 Battle off Dover 19 May 1652
 Fleet Actions, 1.3 Battle of Kentish Knock 28 September 1652
 Fleet Actions, 1.5 Battle off Portland (the 'Three Days Battle') 18 - 20 February 1653
 Fleet Actions, 1.7 Battle of the Gabbard (North Foreland) 2 - 3 June 1653
 Fleet Actions, 1.8 Battle of Scheveningen (off Texel) 31 July 1653
 Fleet Actions, 2.2 Battle of Santa Cruz 20 April 1657
 Fleet Actions, 3.1 Battle of Lowestoft 3 June 1665
 Fleet Actions, 3.3 Battle of the Galloper Sand (the Four Days' Battle) 1-4 June 1666
 Fleet Actions, 3.4 Battle of Orfordness (the St James Day Battle) 25 - 6 July 1666
 Fleet Actions, 5.2 Battle of Solebay (Southwold Bay) 28 May 1672
 Fleet Actions, 5.3 First Battle of Schooneveld 28 May 1673
 Fleet Actions, 5.4 Second Battle of Schooneveld 4 June 1673
 Fleet Actions, 5.5 Battle of Texel 11 August 1673
 Fleet Actions, 6.1 Battle of Bantry Bay 1 May 1689
 Fleet Actions, 6.3 Battle of Barfleur 19-22 May 1692
 Fleet Actions, 7.1 1st Battle off Santa Maria (Columbia) (Benbow's Action) 19-24 August 1702
 Fleet Actions, 7.5 Battle off the Lizard (Edward's Action) 10 October 1707
 Chapter 4 Fourth Rates - 'Small Ships', Vessels acquired from 25 March 1603, Ruby Class, Ruby
 Chapter 4 Fourth Rates - 'Small Ships', Vessels acquired from 2 May 1660, Rebuilt Vessels (1681-87), Ruby
 Chapter 4 Fourth Rates - 'Small Ships', Vessels acquired from 2 May 1660, Post-1702 Rebuildings (54-gun Type), Ruby
 Ships of the Royal Navy, by J.J. Colledge, revised and updated by Lt-Cdr Ben Warlow and Steve Bush, published by Seaforth Publishing, Barnsley, Great Britain, © the estate of J.J. Colledge, Ben Warlow and Steve Bush 2020, EPUB , Section D (Diamond)
 The Arming and Fitting of English Ships of War 1800 - 1815, by Brian Lavery, published by US Naval Institute Press © Brian Lavery 1989, Part V Guns, Type of Guns

Ships of the line of the Royal Navy
Ships built in Deptford
1650s ships
Captured ships